Tulcus thysbe is a species of beetle in the family Cerambycidae. It was described by Dillon and Dillon in 1945. It is known from Costa Rica, Ecuador and Panama.

References

thysbe
Beetles described in 1945